Maria Paternò Arezzo (December 11, 1869, Ragusa Ibla, Sicily — December 28, 1908, Messina), Princess of Castellaci, was an Italian noblewoman and philanthropist who is renowned for her charity bequest to build a hospital for the poor in her city of birth. She was the  daughter of Giuseppe Maria Alvaro Paternò, the 5th Prince of Sperlinga and 13th Baron of Manganelli, and of Vincenzina Arezzo of the barons of Donnafugata. She died when she was only 39 years old, without leaving an heir, under the rubble of the 1908 Messina earthquake together with her husband Francesco Marullo Balsamo, Prince of Castellaci and Count of Condojanni.

Biography
Some years earlier she had willed as her bequest a huge estate intended for the construction of the first hospital in Ragusa, which was to be of service by ensuring at least 30 beds for the care and aid of the city's needy.

The hospital was completed in 1923, and then was united with the Civil Hospital as the Azienda Ospedaliera Civile–Maria Paternò Arezzo: it is an important general hospital pioneering advanced treatments.

On the façade of Palazzo Arezzo in Ragusa Ibla, a marble commemorative stone has been placed in her memory, and a street in Ragusa Ibla is dedicated to her. The municipality, in concert with the Red Cross, has organized celebrations in her memory.

Bibliography
  AA.VV., Il Castello di Donnafugata a Ragusa, Ragusa, Angelica Editore, 2002.

Note

External links
 Family tree of Maria Paternò Arezzo and Marullo 
Ancient Hospitality in Sicily: Ragusa 
Maria Paternò Arezzo: One Hundred Years of Recognition 
http://www.carlomarullodicondojanni.net/famiglia/FamigliaCap5.htm. 

1869 births
1908 deaths
People from Ragusa, Sicily
Italian philanthropists
Sicilian princesses
Natural disaster deaths in Italy
20th-century philanthropists
19th-century philanthropists
Victims of the 1908 Messina earthquake